Panium, an ancient name in honour of the god Pan, may refer to:

 Banias, an ancient site in the Israeli-occupied Golan Heights
 Panion, a city in Eastern Thrace, modern Barbaros
 Battle of Panium, a conflict in 200 BC

See also
 Paneion (disambiguation)